Markabygda Church is a parish church of the Church of Norway in Levanger municipality in Trøndelag county, Norway. It is located in the village of Markabygda. It is the church for the Markabygd parish which is part of the Stiklestad prosti (deanery) in the Diocese of Nidaros. The white, wooden church was built in a long church style in 1887 using plans drawn up by the architect Ole Andresen. The church seats about 170 people.

See also
List of churches in Nidaros

References

Levanger
Churches in Trøndelag
Long churches in Norway
Wooden churches in Norway
19th-century Church of Norway church buildings
Churches completed in 1887
1887 establishments in Norway